Iphinoe is a genus of crustaceans which belong to the family Bodotriidae. It includes the following species:

Iphinoe acutirostris Ledoyer, 1965
Iphinoe adriatica Băcescu, 1988
Iphinoe africana Zimmer, 1908
Iphinoe armata Ledoyer, 1965
Iphinoe brevipes Hansen, 1895
Iphinoe calmani Fage, 1945
Iphinoe canariensis Corbera, Brito & Nunez, 2002
Iphinoe capensis (Zimmer, 1921)
Iphinoe coronata Gould, 1861
Iphinoe crassipes Hansen, 1895
Iphinoe dayi Jones, 1960
Iphinoe douniae Ledoyer, 1965
Iphinoe elisae Băcescu, 1950
Iphinoe fagei Jones, 1955
Iphinoe gurjanovae Lomakina, 1960
Iphinoe hupferi Zimmer, 1916
Iphinoe inermis Sars, 1878
Iphinoe insolita Petrescu, 1992
Iphinoe ischnura Zimmer, 1952
Iphinoe kroyeri Philippi, 1849
Iphinoe maculata Ledoyer, 1965
Iphinoe maeotica Sowinskyi, 1893
Iphinoe marisrubrae Muhlenhardt-Siegel, 1996
Iphinoe pellucida Hale, 1944
Iphinoe pigmenta Kurian, 1961
Iphinoe plicata Le Loeuff & Intes, 1972
Iphinoe pokoui Le Loeuff & Intes, 1972
Iphinoe producta Day, 1978
Iphinoe rhodaniensis Ledoyer, 1965
Iphinoe robusta Hansen, 1895
Iphinoe sagamiensis Gamo, 1958
Iphinoe sanguinea Kemp, 1916
Iphinoe senegalensis Jones, 1956
Iphinoe serrata Norman, 1867
Iphinoe solida Aurivillius, 1885
Iphinoe stebbingi Jones, 1956
Iphinoe tenella Sars, 1878
Iphinoe tenera Lomakina, 1960
Iphinoe trispinosa (Goodsir, 1843)
Iphinoe truncata Hale, 1953
Iphinoe zimmeri Stebbing, 1910

References

Cumacea